Over Staveley is a civil parish in South Lakeland, Cumbria, England. At the 2011 census it had a population of 437.

The parish is within the Lake District National Park.  It has a joint parish council with Hugill and Nether Staveley, formed in 2004 and called Staveley with Ings Parish Council.

See also

Listed buildings in Over Staveley

References

External links

 Cumbria County History Trust: Staveley, Over (nb: provisional research only – see Talk page)

 Staveley: historical and genealogical information at GENUKI

Civil parishes in Cumbria
South Lakeland District